Eric Brodnax (born September 7, 1964) is an equestrian who represents the United States Virgin Islands. He competed in the individual eventing at the 1988 Summer Olympics. He is a graduate of Princeton University and The Wharton School at the University of Pennsylvania.  His grandmother was actress and art collector Ursula Mackarness. His great-great-grandmother was novelist Matilda Anne Mackarness.

References

External links

1964 births
Living people
United States Virgin Islands male equestrians
Olympic equestrians of the United States Virgin Islands
Equestrians at the 1988 Summer Olympics
Sportspeople from San Juan, Puerto Rico